Ashlee Ankudinoff (born 20 August 1990) is an Australian professional racing cyclist.

Biography
Ankudinoff was born in Sydney, New South Wales. She began competitive cycling at the age of fifteen on the road.

Ankudinoff was a member of the gold medal-winning team pursuit squad, and also took the victory in the individual pursuit at the UCI Junior Track World Championships in 2008.

Ankudinoff qualified for the Tokyo 2020 Olympics. She was a member of the Women's pursuit team. The team consisting of Ashlee Ankudinoff, Georgia Baker, Annette Edmondson, Alexandra Manly, Maeve Plouffe finished fifth.

Major results

2008
UCI Track World Championships (Junior)
1st  Pursuit
1st  Team Pursuit, with Megan Dunn & Sarah Kent
2nd Team Pursuit, UCI Track Cycling World Cup Classics
2nd Pursuit, Australian National Track Championships (Junior)
2nd Team Pursuit, Australian National Track Championships (Elite)

2009
Oceania Track Championships
1st  Points Race
1st  Team Pursuit
2nd Individual pursuit, Australian National Track Championships
3rd Team pursuit, Round 2, Track World Cup, Melbourne
3rd Team Pursuit, UCI Track World Championships

2010
1st  Team Pursuit, UCI Track World Championships
1st  Omnium Australian National Track Championships

2011
Oceania Track Championships
1st  Omnium
1st  Scratch Race

2012
Oceania Track Championships
1st  Scratch Race
1st  Points Race
1st  Individual Pursuit
1st  Team Pursuit
2nd Team Pursuit, Track Cycling World Cup Glasgow

2014
Oceania Track Championships
1st  Scratch Race
2nd Team Pursuit (with Georgia Baker, Lauren Perry and Rebecca Wiasak and Elissa Wundersitz)
1st  Omnium Australian National Track Championships
BikeNZ Classic
1st Omnium
1st Scratch Race
 BikeNZ Cup
1st Points Race
1st Scratch Race

2016
Oceania Track Championships
1st  Individual Pursuit
1st  Team pursuit (with Amy Cure, Annette Edmondson and Alexandra Manly)
3rd Madison (with Josie Talbot)

2017
1st Six Day Melbourne (with Amy Cure)
2nd Individual Pursuit, UCI World Track Championships

2018
1st Team Pursuit, Commonwealth Games (with Amy Cure, Annette Edmondson and Alexandra Manly)
National Track Championships
1st  Omnium
1st  Individual Pursuit
3rd Points Race
3rd Madison
3rd Team Pursuit

References

External links

1990 births
Living people
Australian female cyclists
Sportswomen from New South Wales
UCI Track Cycling World Champions (women)
Cyclists from Sydney
Cyclists at the 2016 Summer Olympics
Olympic cyclists of Australia
Cyclists at the 2018 Commonwealth Games
Commonwealth Games medallists in cycling
Commonwealth Games gold medallists for Australia
Australian track cyclists
Cyclists at the 2020 Summer Olympics
21st-century Australian women
Medallists at the 2018 Commonwealth Games